Song Kum-il (born 10 May 1994) is a North Korean footballer who currently plays as a defender for Rimyongsu SC.

Career statistics

International

References

External links
 

1994 births
Living people
North Korean footballers
North Korea international footballers
Association football defenders
Rimyongsu Sports Club players